Soleils couchants ("Sunsets", or "Setting Suns") is a set of six poems, or a six-part poem, by Victor Hugo. The poems were written individually and grouped together later. The first of the poems was written 1828, and grouped together in 1831 in the collection Les Feuilles d'automne.

References

Poetry by Victor Hugo
1820s poems